"I Don't Wanna Cry" is a song by Mariah Carey.

I Don't Wanna Cry or Don't Wanna Cry may also refer to:

 I Don't Want to Cry!, Chuck Jackson's 1961 debut studio album or its title track
 "I Don't Wanna Cry" (Larry Gatlin song), 1977
 "Don't Wanna Cry (Namie Amuro song)", 1996
 "Don't Wanna Cry", a song by Pete Yorn from the album Back and Fourth, 2009
 "Don't Wanna Cry (Seventeen song)", 2017